La Dame de chez Maxim may refer to:

 La Dame de chez Maxim (play), an 1899 play by Georges Feydeau
 La dame de chez Maxim's (1912 film), a 1912 silent French film, adapted from the play
 La dama de Chez Maxim's, a 1923 silent Italian film, adapted from the play
 La dame de chez Maxim's (1933 film), a British French-language film, adapted from the play
 La dame de chez Maxim's (1950 film), a French film, adapted from the play

See also
 The Girl from Maxim's, a 1933 British film, adapted from the play